The 1973–74 Bundesliga was the 11th season of the Bundesliga, West Germany's premier football league. It began on 11 August 1973 and ended on 18 May 1974. FC Bayern Munich were the defending champions.

Competition modus
Every team played two games against each other team, one at home and one away. Teams received two points for a win and one point for a draw. If two or more teams were tied on points, places were determined by goal difference and, if still tied, by goals scored. The team with the most points were crowned champions while the two teams with the fewest points were relegated to their respective 2. Bundesliga divisions.

Team changes to 1972–73
Eintracht Braunschweig and Rot-Weiß Oberhausen were relegated to the Regionalliga after finishing in the last two places. Both teams were replaced by Fortuna Köln and Rot-Weiss Essen, who won their respective promotion play-off groups.

Season overview

Team overview

League table

Results

Top goalscorers
30 goals
  Jupp Heynckes (Borussia Mönchengladbach)
  Gerd Müller (FC Bayern Munich)

21 goals
  Klaus Fischer (FC Schalke 04)
  Klaus Toppmöller (1. FC Kaiserslautern)

19 goals
  Roland Sandberg (1. FC Kaiserslautern)

18 goals
  Uli Hoeneß (FC Bayern Munich)

17 goals
  Hermann Ohlicher (VfB Stuttgart)
  Dieter Müller (1. FC Köln)

16 goals
  Reiner Geye (Fortuna Düsseldorf)
  Johannes Löhr (1. FC Köln)
  Günter Pröpper (Wuppertaler SV)

Champion squad

See also
 1973–74 DFB-Pokal

References

External links
 DFB Bundesliga archive 1973/1974

Bundesliga seasons
1
Germany